The following species in the flowering plant genus Saxifraga, the saxifrages, are accepted by Plants of the World Online. Natural hybridization is commonplace within the genus, and more 2000 horticultural hybrids have been created, but lasting hybrid speciation events appear to be rare.

Saxifraga acerifolia 
Saxifraga adscendens 
Saxifraga afghanica 
Saxifraga aizoides 
Saxifraga × akinfievii 
Saxifraga alberti 
Saxifraga × alejandrei 
Saxifraga aleutica 
Saxifraga × alloysii-villarii 
Saxifraga alpigena 
Saxifraga anadyrensis 
Saxifraga andersonii 
Saxifraga androsacea 
Saxifraga × angelisii 
Saxifraga angustata 
Saxifraga anisophylla 
Saxifraga aphylla 
Saxifraga aquatica 
Saxifraga arachnoidea 
Saxifraga × aragonensis 
Saxifraga aretioides 
Saxifraga × arguellesii 
Saxifraga aristulata 
Saxifraga × arizagae 
Saxifraga artvinensis 
Saxifraga asarifolia 
Saxifraga aspera 
Saxifraga assamensis 
Saxifraga atuntsiensis 
Saxifraga aurantiaca 
Saxifraga auriculata 
Saxifraga babiana 
Saxifraga baimashanensis 
Saxifraga balfourii 
Saxifraga banmaensis 
Saxifraga × baregensis 
Saxifraga benzilanensis 
Saxifraga bergenioides 
Saxifraga berica 
Saxifraga × bertolonii 
Saxifraga bicuspidata 
Saxifraga biflora 
Saxifraga bijiangensis 
Saxifraga biternata 
Saxifraga × blatii 
Saxifraga blavii 
Saxifraga × blyttii 
Saxifraga × borderi 
Saxifraga boreo-olympica 
Saxifraga bourgaeana 
Saxifraga boussingaultii 
Saxifraga brachyphylla 
Saxifraga brachypoda 
Saxifraga brachypodoidea 
Saxifraga bracteata 
Saxifraga brevicaulis 
Saxifraga bronchialis 
Saxifraga brunneopunctata 
Saxifraga brunonis 
Saxifraga bryoides 
Saxifraga bulbifera 
Saxifraga bulleyana 
Saxifraga burmensis 
Saxifraga burseriana 
Saxifraga cacuminum 
Saxifraga × cadevallii 
Saxifraga caesia 
Saxifraga callosa 
Saxifraga calopetala 
Saxifraga × camboana 
Saxifraga camposii 
Saxifraga canaliculata 
Saxifraga candelabrum 
Saxifraga × capitata 
Saxifraga caprariae 
Saxifraga cardiophylla 
Saxifraga carinata 
Saxifraga carnosula 
Saxifraga carpatica 
Saxifraga carpetana 
Saxifraga caspica 
Saxifraga caucasica 
Saxifraga caveana 
Saxifraga cebennensis 
Saxifraga × celtiberica 
Saxifraga cernua 
Saxifraga cespitosa 
Saxifraga chadwellii 
Saxifraga champutungensis 
Saxifraga cherlerioides 
Saxifraga chionophila 
Saxifraga chrysantha 
Saxifraga chrysanthoides 
Saxifraga chumbiensis 
Saxifraga × churchillii 
Saxifraga ciliatopetala 
Saxifraga cinerascens 
Saxifraga cinerea 
Saxifraga cintrana 
Saxifraga clivorum 
Saxifraga coarctata 
Saxifraga × cochleariifolia 
Saxifraga cochlearis 
Saxifraga columnaris 
Saxifraga × columpoda 
Saxifraga congestiflora 
Saxifraga conifera 
Saxifraga × conradiae 
Saxifraga consanguinea 
Saxifraga contrarea 
Saxifraga cordigera 
Saxifraga corsica 
Saxifraga cortusifolia 
Saxifraga × costei 
Saxifraga cotyledon 
Saxifraga × crawfordii 
Saxifraga crustata 
Saxifraga culcitosa 
Saxifraga cuneata 
Saxifraga cuneifolia 
Saxifraga cymbalaria 
Saxifraga dahaiensis 
Saxifraga damingshanensis 
Saxifraga daochengensis 
Saxifraga daqiaoensis 
Saxifraga × darrieuxii 
Saxifraga × davidis-webbii 
Saxifraga debilis 
Saxifraga decora 
Saxifraga decussata 
Saxifraga × degeniana 
Saxifraga demnatensis 
Saxifraga densifoliata 
Saxifraga depressa 
Saxifraga deqenensis 
Saxifraga × desetangsii 
Saxifraga dhwojii 
Saxifraga dianxibeiensis 
Saxifraga diapensia 
Saxifraga diapensioides 
Saxifraga dichotoma 
Saxifraga dielsiana 
Saxifraga diffusicallosa 
Saxifraga dingqingensis 
Saxifraga dinnikii 
Saxifraga × dinninaris 
Saxifraga diversifolia 
Saxifraga dongchuanensis 
Saxifraga dongwanensis 
Saxifraga doyalana 
Saxifraga drabiformis 
Saxifraga draboides 
Saxifraga dshagalensis 
Saxifraga eglandulosa 
Saxifraga egregia 
Saxifraga egregioides 
Saxifraga elatinoides 
Saxifraga elliotii 
Saxifraga elliptica 
Saxifraga embergeri 
Saxifraga engleriana 
Saxifraga epiphylla 
Saxifraga erectisepala 
Saxifraga erinacea 
Saxifraga erioblasta 
Saxifraga eschholzii 
Saxifraga exarata 
Saxifraga excellens 
Saxifraga facchinii 
Saxifraga × farreri 
Saxifraga × faucicola 
Saxifraga federici-augusti 
Saxifraga felineri 
Saxifraga ferdinandi-coburgi 
Saxifraga filicaulis 
Saxifraga filifolia 
Saxifraga finitima 
Saxifraga flaccida 
Saxifraga flagellaris 
Saxifraga flavida 
Saxifraga flexilis 
Saxifraga florulenta 
Saxifraga × fontqueri 
Saxifraga × forojulensis 
Saxifraga forrestii 
Saxifraga × forsteri 
Saxifraga fortunei 
Saxifraga fragilis 
Saxifraga fragosoi 
Saxifraga ganeshii 
Saxifraga × gaudinii 
Saxifraga gedangensis 
Saxifraga gemmigera 
Saxifraga gemmipara 
Saxifraga gemmulosa 
Saxifraga genesiana 
Saxifraga × gentyana 
Saxifraga georgei 
Saxifraga geranioides 
Saxifraga × geum 
Saxifraga giraldiana 
Saxifraga glabella 
Saxifraga glabricaulis 
Saxifraga glacialis 
Saxifraga glaucophylla 
Saxifraga globulifera 
Saxifraga gonggashanensis 
Saxifraga gongshanensis 
Saxifraga granulata 
Saxifraga granulifera 
Saxifraga × guadarramica 
Saxifraga gyalana 
Saxifraga habaensis 
Saxifraga haenseleri 
Saxifraga hakkariensis 
Saxifraga haplophylloides 
Saxifraga harae 
Saxifraga hariotii 
Saxifraga harry-smithii 
Saxifraga × hausmannii 
Saxifraga × haussknechtii 
Saxifraga hederacea 
Saxifraga hederifolia 
Saxifraga heleonastes 
Saxifraga hemisphaerica 
Saxifraga hengduanensis 
Saxifraga × hetenbeliana 
Saxifraga heteroclada 
Saxifraga heterocladoides 
Saxifraga heterotricha 
Saxifraga hirculoides 
Saxifraga hirculus 
Saxifraga hirsuta 
Saxifraga hispidula 
Saxifraga hohenwartii 
Saxifraga hookeri 
Saxifraga hostii 
Saxifraga hyperborea 
Saxifraga hypericoides 
Saxifraga hypnoides 
Saxifraga hypostoma 
Saxifraga imparilis 
Saxifraga implicans 
Saxifraga inconspicua 
Saxifraga insolens 
Saxifraga intricata 
Saxifraga iranica 
Saxifraga irrigua 
Saxifraga isophylla 
Saxifraga italica 
Saxifraga jacquemontiana 
Saxifraga jainzhuglaensis 
Saxifraga jaljalensis 
Saxifraga jamalensis 
Saxifraga jarmilae 
Saxifraga jingdongensis 
Saxifraga josephi 
Saxifraga × jouffroyi 
Saxifraga juniperifolia 
Saxifraga jurtzevii 
Saxifraga × karacardica 
Saxifraga karadzicensis 
Saxifraga kashmeriana 
Saxifraga kegangii 
Saxifraga khiakhensis 
Saxifraga kinchingingae 
Saxifraga kingdonii 
Saxifraga kingiana 
Saxifraga × kochii 
Saxifraga koelzii 
Saxifraga kolenatiana 
Saxifraga kongboensis 
Saxifraga korshinskyi 
Saxifraga kotschyi 
Saxifraga kumaunensis 
Saxifraga kwangsiensis 
Saxifraga lactea 
Saxifraga × lainzii 
Saxifraga lamninamensis 
Saxifraga latepetiolata 
Saxifraga latiflora 
Saxifraga × lecomtei 
Saxifraga lepida 
Saxifraga × lhommei 
Saxifraga × lhostei 
Saxifraga likiangensis 
Saxifraga lilacina 
Saxifraga linearifoiia 
Saxifraga litangensis 
Saxifraga lixianensis 
Saxifraga llonakhensis 
Saxifraga longifolia 
Saxifraga loripes 
Saxifraga losae 
Saxifraga lowndesii 
Saxifraga ludingensis 
Saxifraga ludlowii 
Saxifraga luizetiana 
Saxifraga × luizetii 
Saxifraga luoxiaoensis 
Saxifraga lushuiensis 
Saxifraga × luteopurpurea 
Saxifraga luteoviridis 
Saxifraga lychnitis 
Saxifraga macrocalyx 
Saxifraga macrostigmatoides 
Saxifraga maderensis 
Saxifraga magellanica 
Saxifraga maireana 
Saxifraga mallae 
Saxifraga marginata 
Saxifraga × martyi 
Saxifraga × mattfeldii 
Saxifraga maweana 
Saxifraga maxionggouensis 
Saxifraga mazanderanica 
Saxifraga media 
Saxifraga medogensis 
Saxifraga meeboldii 
Saxifraga megacordia 
Saxifraga × melzeri 
Saxifraga mengtzeana 
Saxifraga micans 
Saxifraga microcephala 
Saxifraga microgyna 
Saxifraga microphylla 
Saxifraga minutifoliosa 
Saxifraga minutissima 
Saxifraga mira 
Saxifraga miralana 
Saxifraga × miscellanea 
Saxifraga monantha 
Saxifraga moncayensis 
Saxifraga montanella 
Saxifraga montis-christi 
Saxifraga × montserratii 
Saxifraga moorcroftiana 
Saxifraga moschata 
Saxifraga mucronulata 
Saxifraga mucronulatoides 
Saxifraga × muretii 
Saxifraga muscoides 
Saxifraga mutata 
Saxifraga nakaoi 
Saxifraga nakaoides 
Saxifraga nambulana 
Saxifraga namdoensis 
Saxifraga nana 
Saxifraga nanella 
Saxifraga nanelloides 
Saxifraga nangqenica 
Saxifraga nangxianensis 
Saxifraga nathorstii 
Saxifraga neopropagulifera 
Saxifraga nevadensis 
Saxifraga nigroglandulifera 
Saxifraga nigroglandulosa 
Saxifraga nipponica 
Saxifraga nishidae 
Saxifraga numidica 
Saxifraga × obscura 
Saxifraga omolojensis 
Saxifraga omphalodifolia 
Saxifraga × opdalensis 
Saxifraga oppositifolia 
Saxifraga oreophila 
Saxifraga osloensis 
Saxifraga ovczinnikovii 
Saxifraga × padellae 
Saxifraga paiquensis 
Saxifraga palpebrata 
Saxifraga paniculata 
Saxifraga paradoxa 
Saxifraga pardanthina 
Saxifraga parkaensis 
Saxifraga parnassifolia 
Saxifraga parnassiodes 
Saxifraga parva 
Saxifraga × patens 
Saxifraga × paxii 
Saxifraga pedemontana 
Saxifraga pellucida 
Saxifraga pentadactylis 
Saxifraga peplidifolia 
Saxifraga peraristulata 
Saxifraga perpusilla 
Saxifraga petraea 
Saxifraga pilifera 
Saxifraga × polita 
Saxifraga poluniniana 
Saxifraga porophylla 
Saxifraga × portae 
Saxifraga portosanctana 
Saxifraga praetermissa 
Saxifraga pratensis 
Saxifraga prattii 
Saxifraga prenja 
Saxifraga presolanensis 
Saxifraga × prietoi 
Saxifraga × prudhommei 
Saxifraga przewalskii 
Saxifraga × pseudocontinentalis 
Saxifraga pseudohirculus 
Saxifraga pseudolaevis 
Saxifraga pseudoparvula 
Saxifraga pubescens 
Saxifraga pulchra 
Saxifraga pulvinaria 
Saxifraga punctulata 
Saxifraga punctulatoides 
Saxifraga quadrifaria 
Saxifraga × ramondii 
Saxifraga ramsarica 
Saxifraga ramulosa 
Saxifraga × recoderi 
Saxifraga retusa 
Saxifraga reuteriana 
Saxifraga × reyeri 
Saxifraga rhodopetala 
Saxifraga × richteri 
Saxifraga rigoi 
Saxifraga × rivas-martinezii 
Saxifraga rivularis 
Saxifraga rizhaoshanensis 
Saxifraga rosacea 
Saxifraga rotundifolia 
Saxifraga rotundipetala 
Saxifraga roylei 
Saxifraga rufescens 
Saxifraga rupicola 
Saxifraga saginoides 
Saxifraga × saleixiana 
Saxifraga sancta 
Saxifraga sanguinea 
Saxifraga saxatilis 
Saxifraga saxicola 
Saxifraga saxorum 
Saxifraga scardica 
Saxifraga × schachtii 
Saxifraga scleropoda 
Saxifraga sediformis 
Saxifraga sedoides 
Saxifraga seguieri 
Saxifraga selemdzhensis 
Saxifraga sempervivum 
Saxifraga sendaica 
Saxifraga serotina 
Saxifraga serpyllifolia 
Saxifraga serrula 
Saxifraga sessiliflora 
Saxifraga shennongii 
Saxifraga sheqilaensis 
Saxifraga sherriffii 
Saxifraga sibirica 
Saxifraga sibthorpii 
Saxifraga sieversiana 
Saxifraga signata 
Saxifraga signatella 
Saxifraga sikkimensis 
Saxifraga sinomontana 
Saxifraga smithiana 
Saxifraga × somedana 
Saxifraga × sorianoi 
Saxifraga × souliei 
Saxifraga spathularis 
Saxifraga sphaeradena 
Saxifraga spruneri 
Saxifraga squarrosa 
Saxifraga staintonii 
Saxifraga stella-aurea 
Saxifraga stellariifolia 
Saxifraga stelleriana 
Saxifraga stenophylla 
Saxifraga stolitzkae 
Saxifraga stolonifera 
Saxifraga stribrnyi 
Saxifraga strigosa 
Saxifraga styriaca 
Saxifraga subaequifoliata 
Saxifraga subamplexicaulis 
Saxifraga sublinearifolia 
Saxifraga submonantha 
Saxifraga subomphalodifolia 
Saxifraga subsessiliflora 
Saxifraga subspathulata 
Saxifraga substrigosa 
Saxifraga subternata 
Saxifraga subtsangchanensis 
Saxifraga subverticillata 
Saxifraga × superba 
Saxifraga svalbardensis 
Saxifraga tangutica 
Saxifraga taraktophylla 
Saxifraga tatsienluensis 
Saxifraga taygetea 
Saxifraga taylorii 
Saxifraga tenella 
Saxifraga tentaculata 
Saxifraga terektensis 
Saxifraga thiantha 
Saxifraga × thrinax 
Saxifraga tibetica 
Saxifraga tigrina 
Saxifraga × tiroliensis 
Saxifraga tombeanensis 
Saxifraga trabutiana 
Saxifraga trautvetteri 
Saxifraga triaristulata 
Saxifraga tricrenata 
Saxifraga tricuspidata 
Saxifraga tridactylites 
Saxifraga trifurcata 
Saxifraga tsangchanensis 
Saxifraga × tukuchensis 
Saxifraga umbellulata 
Saxifraga umbrosa 
Saxifraga unguiculata 
Saxifraga unguipetala 
Saxifraga uninervia 
Saxifraga × urbionica 
Saxifraga vacillans 
Saxifraga valdensis 
Saxifraga valleculosa 
Saxifraga vandellii 
Saxifraga vayredana 
Saxifraga × verguinii 
Saxifraga versicallosa 
Saxifraga vespertina 
Saxifraga × vetteri 
Saxifraga × vierhapperi 
Saxifraga virgularis 
Saxifraga viridipetala 
Saxifraga viscidula 
Saxifraga voroschilovii 
Saxifraga vulcanica 
Saxifraga vvedenskyi 
Saxifraga wahlenbergii 
Saxifraga wallichiana 
Saxifraga wardii 
Saxifraga wenchuanensis 
Saxifraga wendelboi 
Saxifraga werneri 
Saxifraga × wettsteinii 
Saxifraga × wilczekii 
Saxifraga williamsii 
Saxifraga xiaozhongdianensis 
Saxifraga yarlungzangboensis 
Saxifraga yezhiensis 
Saxifraga yoshimurae 
Saxifraga yushuensis 
Saxifraga × yvesii 
Saxifraga zayuensis 
Saxifraga zhidoensis 
Saxifraga zimmermannii 
Saxifraga × zimmeteri

References

Saxifraga